Cher Ami (French for "dear friend", in the masculine) was a male homing pigeon who had been donated by the pigeon fanciers of Britain for use by the U.S. Army Signal Corps in France during World War I and had been trained by American pigeoners. He is famous for delivering a message from an encircled battalion despite serious injuries during the Meuse-Argonne offensive in October 1918.

World War I service
On October 3, 1918, Major Charles White Whittlesey and more than 550 men were trapped in a small depression on the side of the hill behind enemy lines without food or ammunition. They were also beginning to receive friendly fire from allied troops who did not know their location. Surrounded by the Germans, many were killed and wounded and only 194 men were still alive and not captured or wounded by the end of the engagement. Because his runners were consistently intercepted or killed by the Germans, Whittlesey began dispatching messages by pigeon. The pigeon carrying the first message, "Many wounded. We cannot evacuate." was shot down. A second bird was sent with the message, "Men are suffering. Can support be sent?" That pigeon also was shot down. The artillery batteries supporting Whittlesey's men attempted to provide a "barrage of protection" for Whittlesey's men on the northern slope of the Charlevaux Ravine, but believed Whittlesey was on the southern slope of the ravine, resulting in a barrage inadvertently targeting the battalion. "Cher Ami" was dispatched with a note, written on onion paper, in a canister on his right leg,

As Cher Ami tried to fly back home, the Germans saw him rising out of the brush and opened fire. After several seconds, he was shot down but managed to take flight again. He arrived back at his loft at division headquarters 25 miles (40 km) to the rear in just 25 minutes, helping to save the lives of the 194 survivors. He had been shot through the breast, blinded in one eye, and had a leg hanging only by a tendon.

Cher Ami became the hero of the 77th Infantry Division. Army medics worked to save his life. When he recovered enough to travel, the now one-legged bird was put on a boat to the United States, with General John J. Pershing seeing him off.

Awards
The pigeon was awarded the Croix de Guerre Medal with a palm Oak Leaf Cluster for his heroic service in delivering 12 important messages in Verdun. He died at Fort Monmouth, New Jersey, on June 13, 1919, from the wounds he received in battle and was later inducted into the Racing Pigeon Hall of Fame in 1931. He also received a gold medal from the Organized Bodies of American Racing Pigeon Fanciers in recognition of his service during World War I.

In November 2019, he became one of the first winners of the Animals in War & Peace Medal of Bravery, bestowed on him posthumously at ceremony on Capitol Hill in Washington, D.C.

Legacy
To American school children of the 1920s and 1930s, Cher Ami was as well known as any human World War I hero. Cher Ami's body was later mounted by taxidermist Nelson R. Wood at the National Museum of Natural History. When the Smithsonian requested information about Cher Ami, the Signal Corps reported they could not find any war record of Cher Ami being the pigeon "which carried the message from The Lost Battalion." Listing the known details of the bird, the Army, without explanation, described Cher Ami as "he" and the Smithsonian's label reflected the bird's sex as a cock bird. In 2021, the National Museum of American History, together with the National Museum of Natural History and the Smithsonian's National Zoo, had DNA samples from Cher Ami analyzed which concluded the bird is a cock bird. Since 1921, Cher Ami has been on display at the Smithsonian Institution. He is on display with Sergeant Stubby, the (presumed) Boston Terrier mascot of the US Army's 102nd Infantry, in the National Museum of American History's "Price of Freedom" exhibit.

In popular culture

Books, essays, and short stories

"Notre Cher Ami: The Enduring Myth and Memory of a Humble Pigeon," an academic article by Frank A. Blazich, Jr. in The Journal of Military History
Cher Ami and Major Whittlesey, a novel by Kathleen Rooney
Cher Ami: The Story of a Carrier Pigeon, a children's book by Marion Cothren, published in 1934
"Cher Ami", a poem by Harry Webb Farrington
Dear Miss Kopp by Amy Stewart, the sixth book in the Kopp Sisters series, features a fictionalized account of Cher Ami's exploits
Finding the Lost Battalion - Beyond the Rumors, Myths and Legends of America's Famous WWI Epic by Robert J. Laplander
"Cher Ami" a short story by Heather Rounds
"Viva Cuba Pigeon" a short story by Susannah Rodríguez Drissi 
The Ruby Notebook by Laura Resau
"War Pigs", an essay in the collection Animals Strike Curious Poses by Elena Passarello

Film and TV
The Lost Battalion (1919 film), a 1919 silent film, includes the living Cher Ami hopping on one leg. This film also includes many of the soldiers playing themselves, including Lt. Col. Charles Whittlesey. The entire film is available on YouTube.
Cher Ami, a 2008 Spanish film directed by Miquel Pujol and produced by Accio Studios, also known as Flying Heroes or The Aviators.
Flying Home, 2014 a romantic drama film, starring Jamie Dornan features the story of Cher Ami's heroic feat.
Cher Ami is mentioned in season 3, episode 11 of White Collar, first aired 2011.
The Lost Battalion, a 2001 War film about the Meuse-Argonne Offensive of 1918, depicting Cher Ami being sent off with the important message.

See also
 List of individual birds

Notes

References

External links

Collection of the Smithsonian Institution
Recipients of the Croix de Guerre 1914–1918 (France)
Individual domesticated pigeons
Military animals of World War I
World War I military equipment of the United States
1918 animal births
1919 animal deaths
Individual animals in the United Kingdom
Individual taxidermy exhibits